The following is a list of banks in North Macedonia, correct as of 25 October 2022.

Central bank

 National Bank of the Republic of North Macedonia

Commercial and retail banks

Representative offices of foreign banks

Bank Austria Creditanstalt AG Representative Office - Skopje

Saving houses

AL KOSA – Stip
AM - Skopje 
Bavag d.o.o.- Skopje 
Fersped d.o.o. - Skopje 
FULM stedilnica d.o.o.-Skopje 
Gragjanska stedilnica - Skopje 
Inko d.o.o. - Skopje 
Interfalko - Skopje 
Peon - Strumica 
Mak- BS - Skopje 
Mladinec d.o.o. - Skopje 
Moznosti - Skopje

References

Macedonia, Republic of
Banks
Macedonia